The 2010 Weymouth and Portland Borough Council election took place on 6 May 2010 to elect members of Weymouth and Portland Borough Council in Dorset, England. One third of the council was up for election and the council stayed under no overall control.

After the election, the composition of the council was
Conservative 18
Liberal Democrat 11
Labour 5
Independent 2

Background
Before the election the Conservatives had exactly half of the seats with 18, compared to 10 for the Liberal Democrats, 5 Labour and 3 independents. 36 candidates were standing for the 12 seats being contested with the Conservatives defending 7, Labour 2, independents 2 and Liberal Democrats 1.

Election result
The results saw the Conservatives remain as the largest party with 18 of the 36 seats but without a majority. They gained one seat in Tophill West which had been previously held by independent Steven Flew before he stood down at the election. However the Conservatives lost another seat in Melcombe Regis to the Liberal Democrats, with the winning candidate Ray Banham returning to the council on which he had previously served for 10 years. Ian James narrowly held Westham East ward for the Conservatives after having defected from the Liberal Democrats in 2008, while his wife Christine James held Westham North for the Liberal Democrats.

Ward results

References

2010
2010 English local elections
May 2010 events in the United Kingdom
2010s in Dorset